Family Ties (lit. "Birth of a Family") is the second film by South Korean director Kim Tae-yong. Mismarketed as a slapstick comedy through its promotional posters, the film is actually a generation-to-generation view of two families through love and life.

Synopsis
The film is divided into three different 'family' portraits.  The first two take place at roughly the same time.

In part one, restaurateur Mi-ra (Moon So-ri) is satisfied with her ordered, if solitary, life until her ex-con brother Hyung-chul (Uhm Tae-woong) suddenly appears with his much older new wife Mu-shin (Go Doo-shim) in tow.  Mi-ra reluctantly allows them to stay a time with her at the family home, but friction builds over a short time and with the unexpected arrival of Mu-shin's young stepdaughter Chae-hyun, the three adults quickly reach a breaking point.

Part two concerns a quick-tempered young woman Sun-kyung (Gong Hyo-jin) and her relationship with her estranged mother (Kim Hye-ok). Sun-kyung's resentment toward her mother is exacerbated by an affair the latter is having with a married man (Ju Jin-mo). Sun-kyung diligently tries to find employment in Japan, but once her mother dies of cancer, she must care for her young half-brother Kyung-suk and abandon her expatriation.

Part three brings together the first two story lines with the relationship of Chae-hyun (Jung Yu-mi) and Kyung-suk (Bong Tae-gyu) some years later. Kyung-suk, now a college student, is extremely jealous of Chae-hyun's openness to other men in her life and their compatibility is tested as a result of what he considers her "easy" behavior [her promiscuity is neither confirmed or denied]. The film ends with Kyung-suk being accepted by Chae-hyun's adopted family from part one.

Cast

Part 1
Moon So-ri as Lee Mi-ra
Uhm Tae-woong as Lee Hyung-chul
Go Doo-shim as Oh Mu-shin
Lee Ra-hye as young Chae-hyun
Jung Heung-chae as President Kim
Kim Kkot-bi as regular student customer at food stall 1
Lee Na-ri as regular student customer at food stall 2
Hwang Eun-ji as regular student customer at food stall 3
Lee Jin-seon as regular student customer at food stall 4
Kim Dong-young as regular student customer at food stall 5
Jo Joon-hwan as regular student customer at food stall 6
Jo Sung-hwan as regular student customer at food stall 7
Lee In-chul as 동동구리무
Kang-to as Mi-ra's dog

Part 2
Gong Hyo-jin as Yoo Sun-kyung
Kim Hye-ok as Mae-ja
Kim Hee-soo as young Kyung-suk
Joo Jin-mo as Woon-shik
Ryoo Seung-bum as Joon-ho, Sun-kyung's ex-boyfriend (cameo)
Park Joong-hyun as interviewer 1
Kim Hyun-ah as interviewer 2
Song Jeong-woo as interviewer 3
Oh Hye-won as homeroom teacher
Kyungil High School Marching Band as marching band
Song Hyun-hee as Japanese tourist
Han Yoo-na as Joon-ho's girlfriend
Lee Hyun-soon as Woon-shik's wife
Chu Seung-yeob as Woon-shik's son 1
Kim Tae-hoon as Woon-shik's son 2

Part 3
Bong Tae-gyu as Choi Kyung-suk
Jung Yu-mi as Chae-hyun
Im Jung-eun as Hyun-ah
 Ko Kyu-pil as Chae-hyun/Kyung-suk's friend 1
Jeon Mi-young as Chae-hyun/Kyung-suk's friend 2
Jo Myung-yeon as Tae-shik
Hong Jae-sung as Sang-ho
Kim Tae-yoon as Young-ho
Shin Ye-won as child seated at rear end of train
Ryu Seung-hyun as debt creditor man
Woo Hyun as Go Mul-sang
Jo Hee-bong as man fighting on train
Lee Eun-jung as woman fighting on train
Park Mi-hyun as pregnant woman
Monk Jungwae as monk

Awards and nominations

References

External links 
  
 
 
 

2006 films
2006 drama films
South Korean drama films
Best Picture Grand Bell Award winners
2000s Korean-language films
Films directed by Kim Tae-yong
2000s South Korean films